Bored Suburban Youth (also known as BSY and Bored Suburban Youths, in the plural rather than collective form) was among the hardcore punk bands that rose up in the Southeastern United States in the "second wave" of the 1980s.  Along with bands such as Bedlam Hour, Massappeal and The Sex Mutants, BSY contributed to the nascent punk scene in the decidedly un-punk environs of the politically and socially conservative New South.

Inspired by an early 1980s Black Flag show, Bored Suburban Youth was formed by a group of students at Irmo High School in the suburbs of Columbia, South Carolina. The original lineup consisted of John Hathaway (guitar), Troy Tague (drums) and Shannon Burgess (bass). An early lineup featured John Dickerson on vocals, but he was soon replaced by Darren Walker, who fronted BSY for nearly all of the band's four-year run. BSY's sound was characterized as having "buzz saw guitars" and "aggressive vocals," though the band themselves referred to their sound as simply "rock'n'roll."

The longest-lived BSY lineup was Hathaway, Tague, Walker, Steve Sonic (guitar) and Brian Molin (bass). The band's work of this era is best captured in the Live at the Drama Lab recordings; another recording featuring this lineup appears on the compilation lp "Method To Our Madness" issued by Phantom Records in 1986. Sonic joined BSY after the disintegration of seminal Orangeburg, South Carolina punk band Red Menace, which had blazed trails of its own in the early 1980s. Later lineups of BSY would feature two other former members of Red Menace: Kenny "Jolt" Gillam (drums) and Carl Van Sewell (bass).

Like many punk bands of the time, BSY burned out in a few years, but they made a lasting impact on the Southeastern US punk scene by building up a loyal grassroots following and embracing all-ages venues in the region. To this end, BSY would play anytime, anywhere. This DIY ethic led to shows in barns, lodges, galleries, record shops and even high school theatres.

An 8-song 7-inch record posthumously released under the name Red Menace: Farewell Suburbia marked the end of the band in 1988, but BSY's missionary dedication to the punk ethic gave rise to a vibrant alternative music scene in South Carolina and spawned other original bands spanning many musical genres. In 2014, former BSY drummer Kenny Jolt created a video of the 1988 song "Police State" and posted it on YouTube.

Vinyl Discography

There's a Method to our Madness Various artists (1986)
U.S. release (white cover) on Phantom RecordsGerman release (yellow cover) on
We Bite Records.

"Annihilation" (Live) '

Personnel:
 Darren Walker - Vocals
 Steve Sonic - Guitar
 John Hathaway - Guitar
 Troy Tague - Drums
 Brian Mollin - Bass
Engineered by Mike Amos, produced by BSY and Mike Amos. This track was not a live recording, and the actual title was "My Annihilation." It was recorded by Mike Amos in the basement of William's Music in Orangeburg, SC specifically for inclusion on the "Method" album.
 
Red Menace: Farewell Suburbia  (MEP001-A) (1988)

7-inch EP Recorded January 31, 1988, at Sun Sound, Rock Hill, S.C. 8 track recording.
 Contaminated
 Driller Killer
 Sorrow Falling
 Faces
 Police State
 Evolution
 Living In America
 The Slide
Personnel:
 Darren Walker - Vocals
 Steve Sonic - Guitar, Backing Vocals
 John Hathaway - Guitar, Backing Vocals
 Carl Van Sewell - Bass, Backing Vocals
 Kenny "Jolt" Gillam - Drums, Backing Vocals
Engineered by Jake Hunter, produced by Red Menace and Jake Hunter Cover layout by Jerry Axson.

References

External links
 

Hardcore punk groups from South Carolina